Ocean Alley is an Australian alternative psychedelic rock band from the Northern Beaches. The band is made up of Baden Donegal (vocals, guitar), Angus Goodwin (lead guitar), Lach Galbraith (keyboard, vocals), Mitch Galbraith (guitar), Nic Blom (bass) and Tom O'Brien (drums). Their style of music has been described as "cruisey psych, rock and reggae fusion".

The band has released three studio albums and two EPs independently. Their second album Chiaroscuro debuted at No. 15 on the ARIA Albums Chart. Their 2017 track "The Comedown" was voted in at No. 48 in the Triple J Hottest 100, 2017.

In 2019, Ocean Alley had four songs in the Triple J Hottest 100, 2018 "Happy Sad" at number 100, "Baby Come Back (Like a Version)" at number 16, "Knees" at number 10, and "Confidence" at number 1.

History

2011: Formation
The band began playing in a backyard shed in 2011. The members were influenced by the music of Jimi Hendrix, Pink Floyd and Dire Straits, and began performing at venues across the Northern Beaches and the city of Sydney, before releasing their debut EP: Yellow Mellow in September 2013.

2012–2013: Yellow Mellow EP
The band continued to build a following throughout Sydney upon releasing the EP Yellow Mellow, performing at more venues across the city, and began to gather a wider audience online thanks to their title track of the EP, as well as their first music video for the song "Weary Eyed". They first toured interstate in 2014.

2014–2015: In Purple EP
The band went on to tour around Australia five times in their own four-wheel drive (4WD) throughout 2014 and into 2015, gradually building on the size of their shows with each gig. They rounded out their tour dates by releasing their second EP In Purple in August 2015. The EP included the singles "Space Goat" and "Muddy Water".

2015–2016: Lost Tropics and international touring
At the end of 2015, Ocean Alley began recording their debut studio album Lost Tropics. Various tracks were still being completed up until the day they started recording. The band later stated that this style of creation was productive, as they did not second guess what they were recording. They toured over the 2015/16 summer with The Ruminaters in Australia, and then to New Zealand for the first time in March.

Using video footage they captured on the road over summer, they released a music video for lead single "Holiday" and followed up with "Lemonworld", before announcing (and selling out) their East Coast Australian tour dates in support of the independent release of the album Lost Tropics on 16 May 2016, distributed by MGM.

June 2016 marked the beginning of the first major international run of shows for Ocean Alley in support of their debut album. The band would play 40 shows across Europe, including Sold Out shows in the Netherlands and Germany. They also played numerous shows throughout the UK, France, Italy and Switzerland. They would go on to play shows in New Caledonia, before rounding out the Lost Tropics cycle with a tour of Australia and New Zealand, that included appearances at Lost Paradise, Rhythm & Vines, Rhythm & Alps and Soundsplash festival over New Year's Eve.

2017–2018: Chiaroscuro
Ocean Alley officially began work on their second album Chiaroscuro in January 2017. The first single from the album, "Overgrown", was released in March 2017. The band spent the first half of 2017 touring, supporting Australian acts such as Tash Sultana, The Cat Empire and Xavier Rudd across Australia, as well as playing festivals such as The Hills Are Alive and Groovin' The Moo locally in Maitland. They would then announce their largest Australian tour to date to take place in August and September; they sold-out shows across Australia and New Zealand, including two nights at The Metro Theatre in Sydney.

In August 2017, Ocean Alley released "The Comedown" as the second single from Chiaroscuro. The single was premiered by Linda Marigliano on triple j Good Nights on 8 August. The song would go on to be the band's biggest release to date, charting at number 48 on the Triple J Hottest 100 in January 2018.

on 4 February 2018, Ocean Alley premiered their single "Confidence" with Richard Kingsmill on triple j. The track was officially released on 6 February 2018, alongside the announcement of their studio album Chiaroscuro. Chiaroscuro was released on 9 March and charted at No. 15 on the ARIA Charts. In support of the release, the band announced headline shows in Australia and North America, as well as being announced to play the Groovin' the Moo festival nationally and Splendour in the Grass 2018. "Confidence" topped the Triple J Hottest 100, 2018.

2019–2020: Lonely Diamond
On 22 February 2019, Ocean Alley released "Stained Glass", the first single from the band's forthcoming third studio album. The band said "'Stained Glass' is the first song we have written since the release of Chiaroscuro and began, as most of our songs do, with a chord and vocal idea for a verse that Baden envisioned. We recorded and mixed the track at the Grove Studios over two sessions with a focus on guitar tone and interwoven guitar parts - as has always been a staple in our production." On 28 April 2020, Ocean Alley premiered their new single "Hot Chicken" on Triple J and announced their third studio album Lonely Diamond, released on 19 June 2020. The album peaked at number 3 on the ARIA Chart.

2021–present: Low Altitude Living
On 17 November 2021, Ocean Alley released "Touch Back Down", the first track from the band's forthcoming fourth studio album, Low Altitude Living, which the band describes as being "more fun and a Biltmore playful". The album title was announced on 14 September 2022 along with the release of the third single, "Home". Low Altitude Living will be released on 14 October 2022.

Discography

Studio albums

EPs

Singles

Notes

Impact
According to Conor Lochrie of Beats Per Minute, Ocean Alley are "beloved in their home nation" and
"have been on a steady incline to the summit of Australian music" since their formation in 2011. He additionally credits their success to their "upbeat and hazy style [being] embraced by both the festival crowd and the commercial mainstream." Ocean Alley have been cited as an influence by various Australian bands, including Archie, South Summit, and the Rions.

Awards and nominations

ARIA Music Awards
The ARIA Music Awards is an annual award ceremony event celebrating the Australian music industry.

!  
|-
! scope="row"| 2019
| "Confidence"
| Song of the Year
| 
| 
|-
! scope="row"| 2020
| Lonely Diamond
| Best Rock Album
| 
| 
|}

APRA Awards
The APRA Awards are held in Australia and New Zealand by the Australasian Performing Right Association to recognise songwriting skills, sales and airplay performance by its members annually.

! 
|-
! scope="row"| 2019
| "Confidence"
| Rock Work of the Year
| 
| 
|}

J Award
The J Awards are an annual series of Australian music awards that were established by the Australian Broadcasting Corporation's youth-focused radio station Triple J. They commenced in 2005.

! 
|-
! scope="row"| 2018
| Chiaroscuro
| Australian Album of the Year
| 
| 
|}

Rolling Stone Australia Awards
The Rolling Stone Australia Awards are awarded annually in January or February by the Australian edition of Rolling Stone magazine for outstanding contributions to popular culture in the previous year.

! 
|-
| 2021
| "Way Down"
| Best Single
| 
| 
|-

References

2011 establishments in Australia
Australian alternative rock groups
Australian psychedelic rock music groups
Musical groups established in 2011
Musical groups from Northern Beaches